U.S. Route 26 (US 26) is a major cross-state United States highway with its western terminus in the U.S. state of Oregon, connecting U.S. Route 101 on the Oregon Coast near Seaside with the Idaho state line east of Nyssa. Local highway names (see Oregon highways and routes) include the Sunset Highway No. 47, Mount Hood Highway No. 26, and John Day Highway No. 5 before continuing into Idaho and beyond.

Route description

The western terminus of the highway (and of US 26) is at an interchange with U.S. Route 101 between Seaside and Cannon Beach. The highway heads east from there through the Oregon Coast Range, providing access to Saddle Mountain and passing through the valleys of the  Necanicum and Nehalem rivers.  It then crosses over the Oregon Coast Range, where it passes through the Dennis L. Edwards Tunnel, descending into the Tualatin Valley, into the community of Banks.

East of Banks, the highway merges with Oregon Route 6 and becomes a freeway, which passes through the high-tech regions of Washington County.  The freeway enters the Portland metropolitan area in the northeast corner of Hillsboro, then passes through the northern part of the city of Beaverton and the communities of Cedar Hills and Cedar Mill near the intersection with the northern terminus of Oregon Route 217.  Also at this point, MAX Light Rail is adjacent on the north side of the highway for nearly two miles until it submerges into Robertson Tunnel.

The highway enters the Portland city limits near the Sylvan neighborhood, where it is also joined by Oregon Route 8; east of here the highway descends a steep grade through a canyon which penetrates Portland's West Hills; this stretch of the Sunset is coincident with Canyon Road.  The highway skirts the southern edge of Portland's Washington Park, providing access to the Oregon Zoo and other attractions.  At the bottom of the grade, the highway passes through the Vista Ridge Tunnel into downtown Portland.  Immediately east of the tunnel is an interchange with I-405; this interchange is the end of the Sunset Highway.

In Portland, the route overlaps Interstate 405 (Stadium Freeway No. 61) for a short distance before exiting onto city streets, including Arthur Street, to reach the Ross Island Bridge. (Prior to 2005, US 26 ran through downtown Portland on the one-way couplet of Market and Clay Streets, which carry the Sunset Highway to its end at Naito Parkway (Pacific Highway West No. 1W), turning south there to reach the bridge.) US 26 leaves the bridge, which is at the beginning of the Mount Hood Highway No. 26, and follows Powell Boulevard, a surface street, to Gresham.

There were plans to construct a freeway alignment of US 26—the Mount Hood Freeway—to bypass Powell Boulevard; however this project was canceled as a result of the freeway revolts in the 1970s.  A few ramp stubs from Interstate 5 (on the Marquam Bridge) stand as evidence of this project. Roadway connections between the Portland freeway network and Mount Hood remain a big problem, as there is no good direct highway connection.

An expressway begins near Gresham and carries US 26 southeast to near Sandy. From Sandy to near Government Camp and Bennett Pass, where US 26 intersects Oregon Route 35, it closely follows the historic Barlow Road through the Mount Hood Corridor, and is part of the Mount Hood Scenic Byway. The Mount Hood Highway branches off to the north along OR 35, and the Warm Springs Highway No. 53 carries US 26 southeast through Wapinitia Pass  (where it crosses the Pacific Crest Trail), Blue Box Pass, the Warm Springs Indian Reservation, and Agency Plains to Madras. After a short overlap with US 97 (The Dalles-California Highway No. 4), the short Madras-Prineville Highway No. 360 continues southeast to a junction with OR 126 in Prineville.

At that junction, US 26 picks up the Ochoco Highway No. 41, which also follows OR 126 west to US 97 in Redmond. The Ochoco Highway ends at OR 19 near Dayville, from which US 26 follows the John Day Highway No. 5 through John Day to US 20 in Vale. The remainder of US 26 in Oregon overlaps US 20 on the Central Oregon Highway No. 7 to the Idaho state line.

History

An ancient trail passed through the section of the Warm Springs Indian Reservation as part of an extensive Indian trade network linking peoples of the northern Great Basin and Columbia Plateau to those living west of the Cascade Range. Obsidian, bear grass, and slaves were transported over these trails to major trading locations along the Columbia River in exchange for dried salmon, smelt, sturgeon, and decorative sea shells. The long established route was later used by Peter Skene Ogden's fur trapping expeditions in 1825 and 1826. Fur trader Nathaniel Wyeth was here in the 1830s. Captain John C. Frémont followed this route on his 1843 explorations for the United States and Lieutenant Henry Larcom Abbot headed a Pacific Railroad survey party along it in 1855.

The Sunset Highway portion was under construction by January 1933. Both the Works Progress Administration and the Civilian Conservation Corps participated in the construction during the Great Depression. Portions of highway officially opened to the public on September 19, 1941. In 1949, the highway was completed.

The highway was originally named the Wolf Creek Highway after a nearby creek of the same name. The Oregon State Highway Commission renamed it the Sunset Highway at their January 17, 1946 meeting by a unanimous vote. The name is drawn from both the nickname and insignia of the 41st Infantry Division, which was largely drawn from Oregon, and because the highway leads towards the setting sun.

In the 1960s, Powell Boulevard in Portland was proposed as the corridor of the Mount Hood Freeway, which would have replaced US 26. It was cancelled in 1974 following a highway revolt. The state and county government later considered moving US 26 to Division Street between I-205 and Gresham to improve freeway access. The cancelled freeway included plans to bypass Sandy, which were later revived in the 2000s and 2010s to address congestion issues in the area.

US 26 formerly terminated at a junction with US 30 in Astoria, sharing an alignment with US 101 north of Cannon Beach. The highway was truncated by the American Association of State Highway and Transportation Officials in 2005 following a request from the Oregon Department of Transportation.

In 2020, US 26 was designated POW/MIA Memorial Highway by the state legislature following a request from the Bend Heroes Foundation and Oregon Veterans Motorcycle Association.

Major intersections

References

External links

The Seattle Times
Oregon: End of the Trail

26
Transportation in Washington County, Oregon
Transportation in Tillamook County, Oregon
Transportation in Clackamas County, Oregon
Transportation in Multnomah County, Oregon
Transportation in Wasco County, Oregon
Transportation in Baker County, Oregon
Transportation in Clatsop County, Oregon
Transportation in Columbia County, Oregon
Transportation in Grant County, Oregon
Transportation in Jefferson County, Oregon
Transportation in Malheur County, Oregon
Transportation in Crook County, Oregon
Transportation in Wheeler County, Oregon
Mount Hood National Forest
Articles containing video clips
 Oregon